Blizzard (Swedish: Snöstormen) is a 1944 Swedish drama film directed by and starring Åke Ohberg and also featuring Karin Ekelund, Gunnar Olsson and Liane Linden. It was shot at the Sundbyberg Studios in Stockholm. The film's sets were designed by the art director Max Linder.

Synopsis
A man suspected of murder leaves his home town, but becomes caught up in a violent snowstorm.

Cast
 Karin Ekelund as 	Elsa
 Åke Ohberg as 	Lave
 Gunnar Olsson as Kristoffer
 Liane Linden as 	Hanna
 Torsten Hillberg as 	Superintendent
 Harry Ahlin as 	Manager
 Jullan Kindahl as 	Maria
 Theodor Berthels as Restaurant Keeper
 Artur Rolén as 	Guest at Restaurant
 Helga Brofeldt as 	Land-lady
 Hartwig Fock as 	Carlsson
 Artur Cederborgh as 	Man at Restaurant
 Georg Skarstedt as 	Guest at Restaurant
 John Norrman as 	Guest at Restaurant
 Carl Ericson	Lumberjack 
 Albin Erlandzon as 	Old man in woods 
 Astrid Bodin as 	Waitress

References

Bibliography 
 Krawc, Alfred. International Directory of Cinematographers, Set- and Costume Designers in Film: Denmark, Finland, Norway, Sweden (from the beginnings to 1984). Saur, 1986.

External links 
 

1944 films
Swedish drama films
1944 drama films
1940s Swedish-language films
Films directed by Åke Ohberg
1940s Swedish films